Diocese of Šiauliai (Latin: Dioecesis Siauliensis) is a Roman Catholic Diocese of Lithuania. The current bishop is Eugenijus Bartulis (since 1997). The diocese in present structure and territory was established on May 27, 1997.

In 2004 the diocese of Šiauliai had about 269,861 believers (79.7% of the population), 65 priests and 67 parishes.

The Cathedral of Saints Peter and Paul in Šiauliai has been assigned as the Cathedral of the diocese. The main pilgrimage place is Hill of Crosses.

References

External links

 Official Web Site of Diocese of Šiauliai

Roman Catholic dioceses in Lithuania
Culture of Šiauliai